Yanghu Subdistrict is a subdistrict of Yuelu District in Changsha, Hunan, China. It is historically the territory of Yanghu Township, Wangcheng County in 1951. It has three villages and three communities under its jurisdiction.

History
The subdistrict is named after Yanghuyuan or Yanghu Cofferdam, which is the present-day Yanghu Wetland Park. The park is a wetland in the Jin River estuary area. Its ancient name was "Waguankou" (or "Waguan Estuary"). The Jin River is a first-level tributary of the Xiang River and it is named after the tomb of Jin Shang ), a scholar-official of Chu State.

Yanghu Subdistrict was historically a part of Yanghu Township in 1951 and a part of Pingtang People's Commune of Wangcheng County in 1958. In 1962, it was the territory of Pingtang Commune of Pingtang District in Changsha County. Wangcheng County was re-established from Changsha County in 1978 and it was part of Wangcheng County, Pingtang Commune was reorganized as a township in 1984 and Pingtang Township was merged to Pingtang Town in 1985. On June 15, 2008, Pingtang Town was assigned to the jurisdiction of Yuelu District from Wangcheng County.

On August 3, 2012, the town of Pingtang was reorganized as Pingtang Subdistrict. On January 18, 2013, the subdistrict of Yanghu was established from four villages of Yanghu, Lianshan, Lantian and Shantang and three communities of Pingtang, Baimiaozi and Xinsheng of Pingtang Subdistrict.

Subdivisions
When Yanghu Subdistrict was founded in 2013, it had four villages and three communities. As a new round of the Amalgamation of Village-level Divisions in 2016, Shantang Community was established by combining Shantang Village and Xiangping Community (formerly Pingtang Community). The subdistrict has three villages and three communities under its jurisdiction.

3 communities
 Baimiaozi Community
 Shantang Community
 Xinsheng Community

3 villages
 Lantian Village
 Lianshan Village
 Yanghu Village

References

External links
 Official Website （Chinese / 中文）

Yuelu District
Subdistricts of Changsha